Swapnasandhani is a Bengali theater group from Kolkata. The group was founded on 29 May 1992.  Swapnasandhani has been marked by the acting and direction of Kaushik Sen.

Performance
From 2006, Swapnasandhani began performing on a regular basis at the Sujata Sadan every Saturday. This eliminated their need to wait in queue for free slots at the major theatres like the Academy of Fine Arts, Madhusudan Mancha etc.

Major productions
                                 
                                 
                                 
Since the establishment of the team in 1992, Swapnasandhani has staged 30 full-length plays and 14 short ones. Some of those are:
Prothom Partha (1996)
Tiktiki
Jodubongsho
Akhipallab
Prachya
Ajke Aamar Chhuti
Bhalo Rakshosher Golpo (2005)
Banku Babur Bandhu (2006)
Daakghar (2006)
Malyaban (2006)
Suprobhat (2006)
Dakghor (2007)
Hargoj (2008) based on a work of Bangladeshi writer Selim Al-Deen
Bhoy (2009)
Darjiparar Marjinara (2009) written by Bratya Basu, travels through the squalid rooms and alleys of Calcutta’s biggest red-light district Sonagachhi.
Birpurush (2010)
Macbeth (2012) Bengali theatre based on William Shakespeare's play Macbeth.
Thana Theke Aschi (2013)
Karkatkrantir Desh (2014) 
Nirbhaya (2016)
Ashwatthama (2017)
Taraye Taraye (2018)
Ekla Chawlo Reh (2019)
Ardhek Manush (2020)
Kabir Bondhura (2021)
Hamlet (2022)

Celebrity appearance
Bengali film and television actress Roopa Ganguly has acted with Swapnasandhani in the theatre Suprabhat, which was based on a novel of Jibanananda Das.
Actress Arpita Pal acted in the theatre "Notir Pujo", which has been successful.
Television stars Debdut Ghosh and Rajatava Dutta have acted in "Shei Sumouli"
Actor Kanchan Mullick has acted in theatre Darjiparar Marjinara, written by Bratya Basu.
Veteran Theatre actors Debshankar Halder , Ashoke Mukhopadhyay and Surajit Bandopadhyay acted in 2019's new play Ekla Chawlo Reh.

Key people
Chitra Sen
Kaushik Sen
Reshmi Sen
Ditipriya Sarkar
Rabindranath Jana
Riddhi Sen
Monalisa Pal
Surangana Bandyopadhyay

References

Bengali culture
Theatre companies in India
Organisations based in Kolkata
Bengali theatre groups
1992 establishments in West Bengal
Arts organizations established in 1992